The South African Railways Class 17 4-8-0TT of 1926 was a steam locomotive from the pre-Union era in the Natal Colony.

Between 1926 and 1929, to address a shortage of suitable shunting locomotives, the South African Railways rebuilt twenty-one Class A 4-8-2 Mountain type tank steam locomotives to Class 17 4-8-0 Mastodon type tank-and-tender locomotives.

Manufacturers
The Natal Government Railways (NGR) Class D 4-8-2T Mountain type tank locomotive was designed by William Milne, the locomotive superintendent of the NGR from 1877 to 1896, and built by Dübs and Company. One hundred of these locomotives were delivered in ten batches by Dübs between 1888 and 1899 and in 1915 another two were built from spare parts by the South African Railways (SAR) in their Durban shops.

Belpaire firebox
Beginning in 1905, these NGR Class D locomotives, originally known on the NGR as the "Dübs A", were gradually reboilered and fitted with Belpaire fireboxes with wider firegrates. The unmodified locomotives were then designated NGR Class D1 while the modified locomotives with Belpaire fireboxes were designated Class D2.

In SAR service, the NGR Class D1 and D2 were both designated Class A in 1912 while the modified locomotives were referred to as Class A Belpaire.

Rebuilding

When a shortage of suitable shunting locomotives developed in the 1920s as a result of increasing traffic throughout the country and particularly on the Witwaters­rand, the SAR modified twenty-one of the Class A Belpaire  Mountain type tank loco­mo­tives.

The modifications were done between 1926 and 1929 and consisted of the removal of their trailing bissel bogies and coal bunkers, the shortening of their main frames and the addition of tenders to increase their coal and water capacity, thereby converting them to 4-8-0 Mastodon type tank-and-tender locomotives.

Tenders from various scrapped locomotive types were used. The tender depicted in the main picture is a three-axle tender while the official SAR locomotive diagram depicts a tender with four axles on two bogies.

Service
They were employed as shunting engines around Durban, Pietermaritzburg and Port Elizabeth and gave more than thirty years service in this format. In October 1957 Pietermaritzburg’s last two Class 17s were transferred from Masons Mill to Greyville near Durban. The locomotives were all withdrawn from service by 1961, more than seventy years after the first Class A locomotive was built.

In November 1953 two of these locomotives, numbers 1423 and 1431, were purchased by the Zambezi Saw Mills Company for use on their Livingstone-Mulobezi logging railway in Northern Rhodesia. These two engines were scrapped between 1961 and 1963.

Works numbers and renumbering

References

1960
1960
4-8-0 locomotives
2D locomotives
Dübs locomotives
SAR locomotives
Cape gauge railway locomotives
Railway locomotives introduced in 1926
1926 in South Africa
Scrapped locomotives